The University Hospital of Hartlepool is a general hospital in Hartlepool, England. It provides healthcare to people living in southeast Durham. It is managed by the North Tees and Hartlepool NHS Foundation Trust.

History
The hospital has its origins in an infirmary which was built for the Hartlepool Union Workhouse and which opened at Holdforth Road in 1889. The infirmary suffered fire damage during a bombardment on 16 December 1914 during the First World War. It became known as the Howbeck Infirmary in 1925.

It also suffered bomb damage on the night of 7/8 July 1942 during the Second World War.

The Duchess of Kent opened the new Hartlepool General Hospital on the same site in 1972. In 2001 it became known as the University Hospital of Hartlepool.

In 2016 the hospital and grounds were used as the setting for the fictional Brimlington Hospital for BBC One comedy Hospital People.

See also
 List of hospitals in England

References

External links
Official site

Hospitals in County Durham
NHS hospitals in England
Teaching hospitals in England
Teesside University
Buildings and structures in Hartlepool